David A. Hirsch (born October 26, 1960) is an American businessman, fatherhood activist, philanthropist, endurance cyclist, and author. He is a Senior Vice President with UBS Financial Services in Chicago. In 1997, Hirsch founded the Illinois Fatherhood Initiative, a non-profit fatherhood Advocacy group. In 2015 he founded the 21st Century Dads Foundation  which include programs like the Special Fathers Network, a mentoring program for fathers raising children with special needs. He is the author of 21st Century Dads: A Father’s Journey To Break The Cycle Of Father Absence and the host the Special Fathers Network Dad to Dad Podcast with over 225 episodes including guests: Joe Mantegna, Dick Hoyt, and John Crowley (biotech executive).

Biography

Education
Hirsch grew up in Morton Grove, Illinois and attended Niles West High School and graduated from Barrington High School. He attended the University of Illinois at Urbana-Champaign earning a Bachelor of Science degree in Accounting. As an undergraduate, Hirsch was president of the local Theta Xi chapter and a member of the Grand Lodge. Upon graduation he continued with the fraternity as alumni treasurer and the fraternity’s first National Service Project Chairman. He also received the Theta Xi National Fraternity Man of Distinction Award.

Hirsch received his Certified Public Accountant (CPA) designation in 1982, and later attended the Kellogg Graduate School of Management at Northwestern University and earned a Masters of Business Administration in marketing. He is also a graduate of the IMCA Chartered Private Wealth Management Program at the University of Chicago and the Certified Investment Management Analyst Program at University of Pennsylvania’s Wharton School of Business.

Career
In 1982 Hirsch began his professional career as a CPA, auditor and then tax accountant with PricewaterhouseCoopers in Chicago. He later worked for Smith-Barney (1985-2007) and Credit Suisse (2008-2015), before joining UBS Financial Services in 2016.

Awards and recognitions

 National Ethnic Coalition Organization (NECO), Ellis Island Medal of Honor, 2012 
 Theta Xi National Fraternity, Man of Distinction Award, 2009
 Illinois Fatherhood Initiative, Honorary Father Of The Year, 2007
 Illinois CPA Society, Distinguished Service Award, 2005
 U.S. Department of Education, John Stanford Education Heroes Award, 2000
 Registered Representative Magazine, Outstanding Broker, 1995
 Crain’s Chicago Business, 40 Under 40, 1994

Publications

 21st Century Dads: A Fathers Journey To Break The Cycle Of Father Absence. Saint Louis:Transformation Media Books (2016), ISBN 941799353 (with John St Augustine)
 A Case For Collapsing Private Foundations, Investments & Wealth Monitor, January/February 2012

External links 

 21st Century Dads

References

1960 births
21st-century American businesspeople
Living people